Hellview is the second extended play (EP) by American alternative metal band CKY. Released in April 2003 by Island Records and limited to 2,200 copies, the EP contains "96 Quite Bitter Beings" and "Escape from Hellview", from the band's first two studio albums Volume 1 and Infiltrate•Destroy•Rebuild, respectively.

Track listing

Personnel
Deron Miller – vocals, guitar, bass, production assistance
Chad I Ginsburg – guitars, bass, production, recording, mixing
Jess Margera – drums, production assistance on track 1

References

CKY (band) EPs
2003 EPs
Island Records EPs
Fictional populated places